Francis Peter Cundill (October 1938 – January 24, 2011) was a Canadian value investor. He was most noted for his flagship investment fund, Cundill Value Fund. Cundill was a follower of the Benjamin Graham investment style.

Biography
Peter Cundill was born in Montreal, Quebec in October 1938, and was educated at Lower Canada College. He completed a Bachelor of Commerce degree from McGill University in 1960. He then qualified as a Chartered Accountant (1963) and a Chartered Financial Analyst Charter Holder (1968), which lead to a career in the investment management business. Cundill worked at Greenshields Inc. in Montreal and the Yorkshire Group in Vancouver
In 2006 Cundill was diagnosed with Fragile X Tremor/Ataxia Syndrome, an as yet untreatable neurological condition. Cundill died on January 24, 2011, in London.

Investment career
 1974, Cundill started Peter Cundill & Associates Ltd. and Cundill Value Fund was founded.
 1998, Mackenzie Investments acquired Cundill Funds Inc.
 2006, Cundill sold the remaining 5% of his firm to Mackenzie.
 2009, Cundill retired from daily operational fund management, becoming Chairman Emeritus of Mackenzie Cundill.

Recognition
 In 2001, Cundill was presented the Canadian Investment Awards Analysts' Choice Career Achievement award in recognition of proven superior performance and his lifetime contribution to the financial community.
 In 2003, Cundill was presented the Fund Manager of the Year award.
 In 2004, Cundill was honoured with a fellowship by the Institute of Chartered Accountants of British Columbia (ICABC).
 In 2008, Cundill established the Cundill International Prize in History at McGill, which is "awarded annually to an author who has published a book determined to have a profound literary, social and academic impact on the subject".
 Cundill was an Advisory Board Member for the Ben Graham Centre for Value Investing at the Ivey School of Business.

Selected publications
 There's Always Something to Do: The Peter Cundill Investment Approach, Christopher Risso-Gill, 
 Routines and Orgies: The Life of Peter Cundill, Financial Genius, Philosopher, and Philanthropist, Christopher Risso-Gill, Publishing Date November 2014,

References

External links 
 Ivey Business School video, March 28, 2005
 Peter Cundill – In Memoriam
 F. Peter Cundill 1938–2011 : McGill Reporter
 An interview with Peter Cundill – The Globe and Mail

1938 births
2011 deaths
Canadian investors
McGill University Faculty of Management alumni
Businesspeople from Montreal
CFA charterholders